The 26 cantons that make up Switzerland set their public holidays independently – with the exception of 1 August, which is the only federal holiday. Furthermore, holidays can change depending on employers, and some holidays are specific to only a certain town or village. In general, the most reliable list of holidays for a given area will be found in a list of bank holidays, as nearly all shops and offices close during bank holidays.

Public holidays in each canton

Public holidays in specific places, parts of cantons

Notes and references

External links
 Comprehensive overview of Swiss holidays (German PDF file)

 
Swiss culture
Society of Switzerland
Switzerland
Observances in Switzerland
Holidays